New London High School may refer to:

New London High School (Connecticut) in New London, Connecticut
New London High School (Ohio) in New London, Ohio
New London High School (Pennsylvania), a defunct school in Chester County, Pennsylvania
New London High School (Wisconsin) in New London, Wisconsin
New London School in Texas (K–11), site of the 1937 New London School explosion